Nina Heglund (born 24 July 1993 in Oslo, Norway) is a Norwegian-British handball player. She plays for the British national team, and competed at the 2012 Summer Olympics in London. Aged 19 at the start of the games, she was the youngest player in the squad. Heglund has a Scottish mother and is a dual citizen of Norway and the United Kingdom. She plays for the Norwegian team Asker SK.

References

External links

1993 births
Living people
Handball players from Oslo
British female handball players
Norwegian female handball players
Handball players at the 2012 Summer Olympics
Olympic handball players of Great Britain
British people of Norwegian descent
Norwegian people of Scottish descent